Gordon Potter may refer to:

 Gordon Potter (canoeist) (1906–1971), Canadian canoeist
 Gordon Potter (cricketer) (born 1931), former English cricketer